Melville Reeves Hopewell (March 27, 1845 – May 2, 1911) was a Nebraska lawyer and Republican politician who served as the state's 12th lieutenant governor from 1907 to 1911.

Hopewell was born in Monroe County, Indiana in 1845, and moved to Collin County, Texas with his parents in 1851. After his mother died in 1854, the family returned to Indiana, where his father remarried, and then moved to Kansas, followed by Gentry County, Missouri. Hopewell served in the Missouri Mounted Militia in 1863–1864. He graduated from Indiana Asbury University in 1869, was admitted to the bar in Indiana, then moved to Tekamah, Nebraska in 1870. He founded the first bank in Burt County, Nebraska in 1873. In 1887, Nebraska Governor Thayer appointed Hopewell as a district judge, which he served as until 1896, at which point he resumed his practice of law.

In 1906, Hopewell was elected as lieutenant governor. He served from January 1907 until he died in office on May 2, 1911.

References

Lieutenant Governors of Nebraska
1845 births
1911 deaths
DePauw University people
People from Monroe County, Indiana
Nebraska Republicans
20th-century American politicians
People from Tekamah, Nebraska
Nebraska state court judges
19th-century American judges